Liberty Charter High School is located in the city of Lemon Grove, in the Greater San Diego area of San Diego County, California, United States. It is authorized by the San Diego County Board of Education.

It opened to freshman students in August 2008 and added a new class each school year. It is the first start-up charter school authorized by  San Diego County Board of Education, and will eventually enroll over 450 students.

A new campus was scheduled to be constructed in Santee, California, but after the recession started, the campus construction was put on hold due to lack of financing. During the 2009–2010 school year, Liberty was on the campus of its parent school, Literacy First Charter School. Liberty consisted of freshmen and sophomore's. Currently, LCHS is in the process of developing a new high school site in East County.

The high school is part of a K-12 program that is run by the non-profit Literacy First Schools K12.

References

External links 

 

High schools in San Diego County, California
Charter high schools in California
Lemon Grove, California
La Mesa, California
Educational institutions established in 2008
2008 establishments in California